Biloxi was a Siouan language, which was once spoken by the Biloxi tribe in present-day Mississippi, Louisiana, and southeastern Texas.

History 

The Biloxi tribe first encountered Europeans in 1699, along the Pascagoula River.  By the mid-18th century, they had settled in central Louisiana. Some were also noted in Texas in the early 19th century.

By the early 19th century, their numbers were already dwindling. By 1934, the last native speaker, Emma Jackson, was in her eighties. Morris Swadesh and Mary Haas spoke with her in 1934 and confirmed that she spoke the language.

Classification 
Biloxi is an Ohio Valley, or Southeastern, Siouan language. It is related to Ofo and Tutelo.

Phonology 
Multiple possible inventories have been suggested. This article follows that of Einaudi (1976).

Vowels 
Along with contrastive nasalization, Biloxi also has phonemic vowel length.

Notes:
 May be either open-mid or close-mid.
 Biloxi may have a phonetic schwa, but Dorsey-Swanton (1912) and Haas (1968) are consistent in marking it.

Dorsey & Swanton (1912) postulated phonemic vowel length, which was verified by Haas and Swadesh in speaking with Emma Jackson in 1934. Their findings appeared in Haas (1968).

Also, there may still be some uncertainty as to whether certain words contain /ą/ or /an/.

Consonants 

Notes:
 Has a marginal status

Biloxi may also have a phonemic aspiration distinction for some segments.

Phonotactics 
Syllable structure is (C)(C)(C)V(C) or (C)V(C)(C). However, clusters of three consonants are rare.

Most words end in a vowel. The others usually end in /k/ or /x/ as a result of deletion: tox from toho "he fell."

Few consonant clusters end syllables. Most exceptions are caused by vowel deletion: tohoxk from tohoxka "horse."

The following consonant clusters are observed:

Geminates do not occur. /n/ sonorants and probably /d/ occur only as the second elements of clusters. /h/ and /m/ are never the second element. Fricatives do not co-occur.

There are a few three-consonant clusters, all of the form C+s+stop or C+x+glide and some with alternate forms:
 pst
 pstuki~pastuki 'she sews'
 psd
 psdehi~psudehi 'knife' (also spdehi)
 tsp
 atspąhi 'it adheres' (hadespapahi?)
 tsk
 kutska~kudeska 'fly'
 ątska 'infant'
 kst
 aksteke 'he is stingy'
 nsk
 apadenska 'butterfly'
 pxw
 pxwe~pxe 'he punches'
 txy
 akutxyi 'letter'
 kxw
 xoxo kxwehe 'he sits on a swing'
 įkxwe 'always'
 kxy
 pukxyi 'loop'

Grammar

Morphophonemics 

There are many verb roots and two mode markers with the morphophonemically-conditioned alternation e~a~i (underlying ||E||):

 dE 'go'
 andE, yukE 'be'
 yE 'cause'
 E 'say'

 tE '[optative mode marker]'
 dandE '[potential mode marker]'

The alternation depends on the following morpheme:

Nouns and verbs whose stems end in -Vhi or -Vhį change to -Vx before the plural marker -tu:
 ||anahį + tu|| > /anaxtu/ 'their hair'.

That may occur with duti 'to eat' also:
 ||duti + tu|| > /dutitu/~/duxtu/ 'they eat'.

The rule may optionally also apply in compounds and across word boundaries if the next element starts with CV:
 ||asąhi + nǫpa|| > /asąx nǫpa/ 'both arms'.

Nouns that end in -di and can undergo pluralization change to -x: ||adi + tu|| > /axtu/ 'their father'.

Verbs whose stems end in -Vki, -Vpi, or -si optionally lose their -i before the plural marker:
 ||pastuki + tu|| > /pastuktu/ 'they sew'
 ||duhapi + tu|| > /duhaptu/ 'they pulled it off her head'
 ||dusi + tu|| > /dustu/ 'they grabbed'.
||k(i)|| > x/___k occurs optionally across morpheme or word boundaries.
 ||ay + nk + kiduwe|| > ||yąk + kiduwe|| > /yąxkiduwe/ 'you untie me'
 ||mąki ką|| > /mąx ką/ 'when it was reclining'
 but ||yąk + kinitą + xti|| > /yąkinitą xti/ 'it is too large for me'.

The rule may cause the previous vowel to denasalize.
 ||ay + nk + kica daha|| > ||yąk + kica daha|| > /yaxkica daha/ 'you have not forgotten us'
 ||mąki kide|| > /max kide/ 'he sat until'.

Verbs whose stems end in -ti or -hi may optionally change to -x before the negative mode marker ni:
 ||kohi + ni|| > /kox ni/ 'they were unwilling'.

Stems ending in -si optionally become -s.
 ||nk + Ø + kidusi + ni|| > ||axkidusi + ni|| > /axkidus ni/ 'I did not take it from him'.

The dative marker ki becomes kiy before a vowel.
 ||ki + E + tu|| > /kiyetu/ 'they said to him'.

(However, Einaudi cites one counterexample, ||ki + į|| > /kiį/ 'they were drinking it for him', perhaps with a glottal stop inserted.)

The following rule is optional in compounds and across word boundaries and obligatory everywhere else:

V1V1 > V1

V1V2 > V2

 ||ku + ay + ǫni + ni|| > /kayǫ ni/ 'you do not make it'
 ||tątǫ + ahi|| > /tątahi/ 'panther skin'.

However, there are a few words with two adjacent vowels: naǫ 'day', hauti 'be sick', etc.

Two morphophonemically-identical syllables may not appear contiguously, but the former is dropped.
 ||ku + ku ni|| > /ku ni/ 'she does not give'.

Einaudi finds one counterexample, ||kite + te|| > /kite te/ 'she wanted to hit him'.

C1C1 > C1

 ||ca ha + ay + YE|| > ||ca hay + YE|| > /ca haye/ 'you kill'.

The following rule optionally applies to compounds:

XV#CY > XCY

 ||cake + pocka|| > /cakpocka/ 'hand + round' = 'fist'.

That may lead to otherwise-disallowed clusters, including geminates:
 ||ayapi + pa + są|| > /ayappasa/ 'eagle + head + white' = 'bald eagle'
 ||ndesi + xidi|| > /ndesxidi/ 'snake + chief' = 'rattlesnake'.

The following rule applies to compounds:

Vn#C > V̨#C

 ||dani + hudi|| > ||dan + hudi|| > /dąhudi/ 'eight'.

The following rules are conditioned by person markers on nouns and verbs:

Stems beginning with /h/ and some beginning with /y/ (morphophonemically distinguished as ||Y||) undergo the following (obligatory for h-stems but optional for Y-stems):
||Y, h|| > ∅ / ||nk||___, ||ay||___

 ||nk + Yehǫ + ni|| > /nkehǫni/ 'I know'
 ||nk + hu + di|| > /nkudi/ 'I come from'.

However, that does not apply for y-initial (rather than Y-initial) stems:
 ||nk + yaǫni|| > /nkyaǫni/ 'I sing'.

The following rule applies before roots and the dative marker ki:
||nk|| > /x/ /___k

 ||nk + ku|| > /xku/ 'I come back hither', ||nk + ki + ku|| > /xkiku/ 'I gave him'
||nk|| > /ǫ/ /___n (optionally /m/, /p/)

 ||nk + nąki|| > /ǫnąki/ 'I sit'
 ||nk + pxitu|| > /ǫpxitu/ 'we cheat'
||nk|| > /n/ /___other consonants (optional except before /p/ and for /m/ unless it was covered by the previous rule)

 ||nk + yą ni|| > /nyą ni/ 'I hate him'
 but ||nk + sįto|| > /nksįto/ 'I am a boy'
||nk|| > /nk/ /___V

 ||nk + ǫ|| > /nkǫ/ 'I make'

(optionally) ||ay|| > /aya~ya/ /___k,x

 ||ay + kide|| > /yakide/ 'you go home'
 ||ay + kitupe|| > /ayakitupe/ 'you carry on your shoulder'
||ay|| > /i/ /___C

 ||ay + duti + tu|| > ||ay + duxtu|| > /iduxtu/ 'you pl. eat'
||ay|| > /ay~y~iy/ /___V

 ||ay + įsihi + xti|| > /ayįsihi xti/ 'you fear greatly'
 ||ay + andE hi ni|| > /yanda hi ni/ 'you shall be so'
 ||ay + E|| > /iye/ 'you say'.

The use of different allomorphs in free variation is attested for some verbs.

The next four rules combine personal affixes and so apply only to verbs:
||nk + ay|| > /į/ /___C

 ||nk + ay + naxtE|| > /įnaxte/ 'I kick you'
||nk + ay|| > /ny/ /___V

 ||nk + ay + įdahi|| > /nyįdahi/ 'I seek you'
||nk + ∅|| > /ax/ /___k

 ||nk + Ø + kte|| > /axkte/ 'I hit him'
||ay + nk|| > /yąk/ (which may undergo further changes as described above)

 ||ay + nk + dusi|| > /yandusi/ 'you take me'

The subjunctive mode marker ||xo|| undergoes the following rule:
||xo|| > /xyo/ / i___ / į___

 ||ǫ nani xyo|| 'she must have done it'

The habitual mode marker ||xa|| optionally undergoes the following rule:
||xa|| > /xya/ / Vf___

 ||ande xa|| > /ande xya/ 'she is always so'
 but ||nkaduti te xa|| > /nkaduti te xa/ 'I am still hungry'

The auxiliary ande undergoes the following rule:
||ande|| > /ant/ / ___k

 ||nkande kąca|| > /nkant kąca/ 'I was, but'

Morphology 
The three word classes in Biloxi are verbs, substantives (nouns and pronouns), and particles. Only  first two take affixes.

Verbs are always marked for person and number and may also take dative, reciprocal, reflexive, and/or instrumental markers as well as mode markers, the object specifier, and auxiliaries. They are at or immediately before the end of clauses.

All nominal affixes may also be used with verbs, but nouns use a subset of the verbal affixes. They may not use dative, reciprocal, reflexive, or instrumental markers or mode markers or auxiliaries.

Particles serve many functions, including noun phrase marking and acting as adverbials.

Inflection

Nouns 
Nouns may be inflectable or, as most are, non-inflectable.

The former group inflects for person and number. It contains names of body parts and kin terms, which must inflect, and a few other personal possessions, with option inflection. The person markers are nk- for the first person, ay- second person, and Ø- for the third person.

They may be pluralized with the marker -tu. The noun's number itself is not marked explicitly.

Examples of inflected nouns are below:
 dodi 'throat'
 ndodi 'my throat'
 idodi 'your throat'
 doxtu 'their throats'
 adi 'father'
 iyadi 'your father'
 nkaxtu 'our father'

Here are examples of optionally-inflected nouns:
 ti~ati 'house'
 nkti/nkati 'my house'
 doxpe 'shirt'
 idoxpe 'your shirt'

Personal pronouns are formed by inflecting the root indi for person and number. (It may once also have been done by the demonstratives he and de.) Pronouns are always optional, and are emphasis. Singular pronouns may occur as either the subject or the object, but the plurals are always subjects (see -daha).

 In free variation with ind and int before /h/
 In free variation with įxt before /h/

Biloxi has two common demonstratives: de 'this' and he 'that'. They may be marked for plurality as denani and henani, but that is very rare since they are used if plurality is unmarked elsewhere, and it  is marked on the verb in noun phrases with classificatory verbs:
 ąya atąhį amą de 'these running men'

Verbs 

Verbs inflect for person (1st, 2nd, 3rd), number (singular vs. plural), and mode (many possibilities, including some less-well understood mode markers).

Morphemes within verbs have the following order:

 Very occasionally an enclitic will proceed -tu, e.g. supi xti tu 'they are very black'.

Verbs may either be classificatory or normal. Classificatory verbs specify the subject's position (sitting, standing, etc.) and differ from normal verbs in that the first person is not inflected for person.

Inflection for person and number is identical to inflected nouns:
 nk- 1st person
 ay- 2nd person
 Ø- 3rd person
 -tu pluralizes referent of prefix (not used for inanimate subjects)

Because of the rules determining the surface manifestations of some combinations of person markers, 2nd person on 1st and 3rd person on 1st forms are identical, e.g. yaxtedi 'you hit me, he hit me'. Also, 2nd person subj., 2nd person on 3rd, and 3rd person on 2nd are identical, e.g. idǫhi 'you see, you see him, they see you'.

-tu marks animate plurality (except with some motion verbs).
 įkcatu ni 'we have not forgotten you'
 nkyehǫtu ni 'we did not know'

However, -tu is not used:

 In the presence of the plural auxiliary yuke 'are':
 dǫhi yuke 'they were looking at it'
 When the sentence has already been marked as plural:
 aditu ką, hidedi nedi 'they climbed up, and were falling continually'
 If it is followed by a plural motion verb:
 dą kahi hą 'they took it and were returning'

Some (but not all) verbs of motion mark plurality with the prefix a- inserted directly before the root:
 de 'he goes'
 nkade 'we go', ayade 'you (pl.) go', ade 'they go'
 kide 'he goes homeward'
 xkade 'we go homeward'

But there are counterexamples (even ones derived from the same roots):
 kade 'he goes thither'
 xkadetu 'we go thither', ikadetu 'you (pl.) go thither'

daha marks plural objects when they are not specified elsewhere. It comes after -tu and before all mode markers.

Examples:
 de ya daha 'he sent them'
 yacǫ daha ǫni 'she named them (in the past)'

There are two examples of daha being reduced to ha:
 įkte ha dande 'I will kick you (pl.)'
 nyiku ha dande 'I will give it to you (pl.)'

a- may be added to some verb roots to mark an unspecified indefinite object:
 ki 'carry on back'
 nkaki 'I carried something on my back'
 da 'gather'
 nkada 'I gather things'

Mode markers 

There are many mode markers in Biloxi. Some are common and well understood, while others are infrequent and have elusive meanings.

{| class="wikitable"
|+ Mode markers
! rowspan="2" colspan="2" | Mode
! rowspan="2" | Marker
! colspan="2" | Position
! rowspan="2" | Examples
! rowspan="2" | Comments
|-
! Follows:
! Precedes:
|-
! colspan="2" | Declarative mode
| na, male speaker  ni, female speaker
| colspan="2" align="center" | always last
|
 na
  nka dande na 'I will say it'
 hetinyǫ nyukedi na 'we are just going to do so to you'
 ni
 nkadutedą ni 'I have finished eating'
 įkowa įdahi otu ni 'they themselves hunt and shoot it'
| Usage is optional:
 taneks nkąxti 'I am a Biloxi woman'
 cǫki itak nąki 'you dog sits' (= 'you have a dog')
|-
! colspan="2" | Interrogative mode
| wo, male speaker  ∅, female speaker
| colspan="2" align="center" | always last (never appears with declarative)
|
 wo
 etikįnyǫni wo 'did I do that to you?'
 iyixǫ wo 'have you had enough?'
 ayą ade wo 'does the wood burn?'
 ∅
 kihaki cidike yukedi 'what kin are they two?'
 ayą ade 'does the wood burn?'
| It is unclear what sort of intonation accompanied the interrogative.
|-
! colspan="2" | Hortatory mode
| hi
|
| na (or wo)
|
 te hiyetu hi na 'you must kill him'
 nyiku hi ni 'I shall give it to you'
| Almost always appears before declarative na/ni, but there's one example of it before wo:
 kawa nkǫ ta hi wo 'what will (we) wish to do?'

Also, it may appear on its own in embedded sentence:
 ani ndǫ ni nkanda hi yihi 'he thought I should not see the water'
|-
! colspan="2" | Potential mode
| dande
| tu  daha
| na  xe
|
 adutik kikǫ daha dande 'he will make food for them'
 nka dande na 'I will say it'
|
|-
! colspan="2" | Optative mode
| tE1
| tu  daha
| dande  ǫ  wo  hi  ni
|
 yąxkiyoxpa te yayukedi 'you (pl.) are wishing to drink it up for me'
 pis te xti ande 'she strongly desires to suckle'
| te almost always follows -tu, but there is a counter-example:
 te ye te tu ką 'when they wished to kill him'
 cf. te hiyetu te ko 'when they wished to kill you'
|-
! colspan="2" | Subjunctive mode
| xo~xyo2
| colspan="2" align="center" | always last
|
 kedi xyo 'he must (?) dig it alone
 įnaxta xo 'I will kick you, if'
| Semantic force is in question. Involves potentiality and contingency ('... if/provided).

nani 'can' may appear before 'xyo', lending it the meaning 'must' or 'must have':
 ǫ nani xyo 'she must have done it'
 ede te yake daha yandi nani xyo 'this must be the one who killed us'
|-
! colspan="2" | Habitual mode
| xya~xa3
| Everything except...
| ... na/ni
|
 supixtitu xa 'they are usually very black'
 tiduwi xa 'he alights'
 nkakiyasi xa na 'I always liked it' (masc.)
 nkint ko yinisa ndux ni xa ni 'I never eat buffalo meat' (fem.)
| Habitual and declarative combined are sometimes glossed as 'can':
 tąhį xa na 'he can run' (if he wishes)
 akutxyi nkǫ xa na 'I can write'
|-
! colspan="2" | Negative mode
| (ku)...ni| colspan="2" align="center" |
|
 kudǫxtu ni xti 'they could not see them at all'
 ayį ni dande 'you shall not drink'
| It's unclear when ku is needed. It is used for stems ending in -ni and with the feminine declarative marker ni4.

The negative form of the verb duti 'eat' is kdux ni 'he did not eat', and not the expected kudux ni.
|-
! rowspan="3" | Imperative mode
! Positive
| ta, male speaker to male addressee

di, male speaker to female addressee

te, female speaker to male addressee

∅, probably used to address children, possibly also female speaker to female addressee

xye na, first person plural
| stem (+ number marker)
|
|
 ta
 eyąhį ta 'come!'
 adǫxtu ta 'look!' (you all)
 di
 akanaki daca di 'come out and gnaw on it!'
 dupaxi di 'open the door!'
 te
 dǫxtu te 'you all look!'
 dǫ te 'look at him!'
 ∅
 yąxkiduwa 'untie me!' (sun to child)
 ndao hu hą sinihǫ duti hąca 'come here and eat much with me!' (fem. to fem.)
 xye na
 te ye xye na 'let us kill her!'
| rowspan="3" | The plural marker -tu (or a-) is used for plural addressees, and person markers mark objects (except for 2nd person negative imperative).

There is one example of the person marker omitted from the (ku)...ni imperative:
 kąhą ni 'do not cry!'
|-
! Negative
| na5; second person strong negative(ku)...ni (the regular indicative form)
|
|
|
na
 yada na 'beware lest you all go!'
 ayį na 'do not drink it!'
(ku)...ni
 ayįktu ni 'do not (ye) let him go!'
 akohi ina ni 'do not stand in the yard!'
|-
! Rare
| hi ko5; "deferential"dki~tki6 (possibly for female addressees)ką| colspan="2" | hi ko: same as hi (potential mode marker)
|
 hi ko
 eke xyi dį ini hi ko 'well, why don't you want (as you have been talking about it for so long!)'
 ayįxtu ikada hi ko 'you go home yourselves (instead of telling us to do so!)'
 dki~tki
 ayindi ded ki 'you go yourself!' (male to female)
 ini te xti ko, nit ki 'well, walk (as you are so persistent!)'
 ką duxtą aku ką 'pull it and bring it here!'
 de dǫx ką cidike yuke 'go and see how they are!'
|-
! colspan="2" | Dubitative mode
| ha|
| na/ni
|
 yihixtitu ha ni 'they might have the most' (fem.)
 kiyetu kąca ha na 'they must have told her'
| Meaning somewhat uncertain due to limited data.

Appears adjacent to na/ni like hi, but unlike it is does this even in embedded sentences.
|-
! colspan="2" | Strong declarative mode
| xye, masc speaker  xe, female speaker
| xye: follows dande
| xe: precedes xo
|
xye
 nitani xye 'it is large'
 ade ixyǫtu xye 'they talk very rapidly'
xe
 itoho ko nitani xe 'the log is large'
 nkapa nedi xe 'my head aches'
| Stronger semantic force than na/ni.

xye/xe may be followed by xo, but it's unclear whether this lends additional meaning:
 nda dande xye xo 'I will go whether he wishes or not'
|-
! colspan="2" | Inferential mode
| yeke| dande
| na
|
 anik wahetu yeke 'they must have gone into the water'
 kide yeke na 'he must have gone home'
| Most often used with a declarative marker.
|-
! colspan="2" | Intensification
| wa|
|
|
 ksixtu wa 'they are very crazy'
 nkaduti wa nkande 'I am ever eating'
| It is unclear exactly how wa differs from xti (see below). It is possible that xti means 'very' while wa means 'so'.

wa sometimes may be glossed as 'always'.
|-
! colspan="2" | Completive mode
| ǫ~ǫni| te  xti
| xa
|
 ǫ
 eyąhi ǫ he got there (long ago)
 atuka kitani ǫ 'the raccoon was first (in the past)'
 ǫni
 kitsąya yą tanaki utoho ǫni 'the American first lay in it (in the past)'
 ani yą hu ǫni 'the water was coming'
| Emphasizes that the event occurred in the past.

ǫ often is followed by xa, which may be glossed either as the expected 'regularly in the past', or 'in the remote past':
 kide ǫ xa 'she went home (in the remote past)'
 etikǫtu ǫ xa 'they did so (regularly in the past'
|-
! colspan="2" | Superlative mode
| xti| colspan="2" | occurs immediately after whatever is being intensified
|
 supi xti tu 'they are very black'
 tca yi xti ande 'he was killing all'
| xti may be used with adverbs:
 ewite xti 'very early in the morning'
 kuhi xti 'very high'
|-
|}
 With morphophonemic ||E||, see above
 ||xo|| > ||xyo|| / i___ / į___ (see above)
 ||xa|| > ||xya|| / Vf___ optionally (see above)
 because ||ni + ni|| > /ni/, see above
 requires person marker
 Stems ending in -di lose -i and gain -ki, others just gain tki

 Derivation 
 Nouns 

Nouns may be derived either through nominalizing verbs or by compounding.

Verbs are nominalized via the prefix a-:
 sǫ 'sharp at all ends'
 asǫ 'briar'
 duti 'eat'
 aduti 'food'

Compound nouns may either be formed by combining two nouns or a noun and a verb. (Some morphophonemic rules are involved, see above.)

noun + noun:
 ||cindi + aho|| > /cindaho/ 'hip + bone' = 'hip bone'
 ||peti + ti|| > /petiti/ 'fire + house' = 'fireplace'

noun + verb:
 ||sǫpxi + ǫni|| > /sǫpxǫni/ 'flour + make' = 'wheat'
 ||ąyadi + ade|| > /ąyadiade/ 'people + talk' = 'language'

 Pronouns 

For the personal pronoun indi, see above. įkowa may be used as a reflexive pronoun. It is possible that both of these, and perhaps the reflexive pronoun -įxki- (see below) are derived from a root in.

 Interrogatives 

A number of interrogatives come from the prefix ca- (with vowel elision following morphophonemic rules):
 cak~caką 'where?'
 cane 'where (stands)?'
 canaska 'how long?'
 cehedą 'how high, tall, deep?'
 cidike 'which, how, why?'
 cina~cinani 'how many'

Some are derived from pronouns:
 kawa 'something, anything'
 kawak 'what?'
 cina 'a few, many'
 cinani 'how many?'

 Verbs 

Verbal derivation may occur by root derivation (reduplication and compounding) or stem derivation (thematic prefixes, dative markers, reciprocals, reflexives, and instrumentals.)

 Reduplication 

Reduplication, common in Biloxi, is used for intensification or distributiveness. Usually, the first CVC of the root is reduplicated but sometimes it is only the first CV:

 cakcake 'he hung up a lot'
 cake 'hang up on a nail or post'
 tixtixye '(his heart) was beating'
 tix 'beat'
 xoxoki 'he broke it here and there'
 xoki 'break'
 ǫnacpicpi 'my feet are slipping'
 cpi 'slip'

 Compounding 

Verbal compounds may be noun + verb or verb + verb.

It seems that most noun-verb compounds are formed by using the verb ǫ 'do, make':
 ||ką + k + ǫ|| > /kąkǫ/ 'string + make' = 'trap'
 ||cikide + ǫ|| > /cidikǫ/ 'which = do' = 'which to do (how)'
 ||ta + o|| > /tao/ 'deer + shoot' = 'shoot deer'

Examples of verb-verb compounds:
 hane + o /haneotu/ 'they find and shoot'
 kte + ǫ /įkteǫni/ 'with + hit + do' = 'to hit with'

Some of the above compounds end up having adjacent vowels, since syncope in compounds is optional.

 Thematic prefixes 

Thematic prefixes come after person markers and before dative markers and instrumentals.

 Dative, reciprocal, and reflexive markers 

The dative marker ki- (kiy- before vowels) is used after thematic prefixes.
 kiyetu 'they said to him'
 kidǫhi ye daha 'he showed it to them'

It is peculiar in that it may be used if someone else's body parts are the direct object (the "dative of possession"). 
 kiduxtą 'they pulled his [tail]'
 kidǫhi '[they] saw his [shadow]'
 kidǫhi 'she looked at her [head]'

It appears as kik- before ǫ 'do, make' and gives it a benefactive gloss (kikǫ daha 'he made for them'). (It should not be mistaken for kiki-.)

The reduplicated kiki- marks reciprocity. The plural marker -tu is then optional.
 kikiyohǫ 'they were calling to one another'
 kikidǫhi 'they were looking at one another'įxki- (or ixki-, perhaps because of the denasalizing morphopohnemic rule above) marks reflexives. It normally comes immediately after person markers, but in some third-person cases, ki- may come before it:
 įxkiyadu ye ande 'he was wrapping it around himself'
 kixkidicatu 'they wash themselves'

 Instrumental prefixes 
Instrumentals serve to mark how the event was carried out and immediately precede the root.

 Einaudi speculates that V1V2 is not removed because of possible ambiguity.
 Only traces of the prefixes remain.

 Adverbs 

Adverbs may be derived from connectives, pronouns, and verbs and particles via a number of affixes:

 Connectives 

There are various instances of derived connectives:
e- 'and (?), the aforesaid (?)'
 ehą ||e + hą|| 'and then'
 eką ||e + ką|| 'and then'
 eke ||e + ke||(?) 'and so'
eke 'so' (probably derived itself, see above)
 ekedi ||eke + di|| 'that is why'
 ekehą ||eke + hą|| 'and then'
 ekeką ||eke + ką|| 'and then'
 ekeko ||eke + ko|| 'well'
 ekeǫnidi ||eke + ǫni + di|| 'therefore'

 Numerals 

Derived numbers contain predictable vowel syncope (see above).

 may be derived from ||nǫpa + ahudi|| 'two + bones' and ||dani + ahudi|| 'three + bones'

11-19 are derived via the formula 'X sitting on Y' ('Y Xaxehe').

20-99 are derived via the formula 'X sitting on Y Zs' ('Z Y Xaxehe')

 shows up twice as kįkįkeOrdinal numerals (1st, 2nd, 3rd) are not attested. To express 'once', 'twice', 'three times', etc.', use the verb de 'to go' before cardinal numbers:
 de sǫsa 'once'
 de nǫpa 'twice'
 de dani 'three times'
 de topa 'four times'
 de ksani 'five times'

To form multiplicatives, use akipta 'to double' before cardinal numbers:
 akipta nǫpa 'twofold'
 akipta dani 'threefold'
 akipta topa 'fourfold'
 akipta ohi 'tenfold'
 akipta tsipa 'one hundredfold'

 Syntax 

Biloxi is a left-branching SOV language.

Its lexical categories include interjections (I), adverbials (A), subjects (S), objects (O), verbs (V), and connectives (C).

The three types of phrases are:
 interjectory phrases: I with pauses before and after it
 tenaxi 'Oh friend!'
 postpositional phrase: pp N (yą)/(de) (see below)
 doxpe itka 'inside a coat'
 noun phrase: any S or O (see below)
 ayek ita 'your corn'

There are dependent and independent clauses, and major and minor sentences. (see below)

 Interjections 

Interjections may be:

 Interjectory particles 
 aci 'o no!'
 he he 'hello!'
 nu: 'help!'
 ux 'pshaw!'

 Animal cries 
 a: a: 'caw'
 pes pes 'cry of the tiny frog'
 taǫ 'cry of the squealer duck'
 tį 'cry of the sapsucker'

 Vocatives 

Vocatives are almost always unmarked:
 kǫkǫ 'O grandmother!'
 kǫni 'O mother!'
 cidikuna 'Oh Cidikuna!'

There are only three exceptions:
 tata 'Oh father!' (suppletive – the regular stem meaning 'father' is adi)
 nyąxohi 'Oh wife!' (literally 'my old lady')
 nyąįcya 'Oh husband!' (literally 'my old man')

 Adverbials 

Adverbials most often appear directly before the verb, but they may also act as subjects and object. They may not follow verbs or precede connectives in sentence-initial position.

Adverbials may be:

 Adverbial particles 

Some particles:
 tohanak 'yesterday'
 emą 'right there'
 eyą 'there'
 kiya 'again'
 yąxa 'almost'

(Also, see "adverbs", above.)

Usage examples:
 skakanadi ewitexti eyąhį yuhi 'the Ancient of Opossums thought he would reach there very early in the morning'
 ekeką kiya dedi 'and then he went again'
 ndao ku di 'come back here!' (male to female)
 tohanak wahu 'yesterday it snowed'

 Postpositional phrases 

(For vowel elision, see above.)

Notes:
 may have a base form yaski less occurrences than kuya~okaya eu here, an unexpected diphthong, is shortened ewa 'there'

Almost all of the above allow following de or yą. de has the expected meaning 'here' or 'this', while yą may be glossed 'the' or 'yonder'.

Prepositions are sometimes used without modifying a noun, becoming adverbial:
 sąhį yą kiya nkǫ 'I do it again on the other side'
 itka yą ustki 'to stand a tall object on something'
 kuya kedi 'to dig under, undermine'

 Multiplicatives 

Such as:
 de nǫpa 'twice'
 de dani 'three times'
 de topa 'four times'

 Some interrogatives 

 derived from cina cak and caką appear to be in free variation
 occurs indicatively a few times, e.g. anahįk cinani kiduwe 'he untied some hair for her'

 Subjects and Objects 

Subjects and objects are formed almost identically, save for the fact that the nominal particle ką may only be used after objects.

A subject or object must include a simple noun (N), and may optionally also include a verb (V), nominal particle (np), and/or demonstrative pronoun (dp), in that order.

If the noun is a personal pronoun, it may only (optionally) be followed by either a demonstrative pronoun or a nominal particle, but not both. For other pronouns (e.g. de 'this'), they may not be followed by anythihng.

Examples:

N V
 ąya xohi 'the old woman'
N np
 ąya di 'the person'
N dp
 ąya de 'these people'
N V np
 ąya xohi yą 'the old woman'
N V dp
 ąya nǫpa amąkide 'these two men'
N np dp
 ǫti yą he 'the bear, too'
N V np dp
 ąya sahi yą he 'the Indian, too'

Possession in S's and O's is expressed by the possessor followed by the possessed, followed by np's.
 ąya anahį ką 'people's hair' (obj.)
 ąya tik 'the man's house'

Two subjects may be juxtaposed with reciprocal verbs:
 cetkana ǫti kitenaxtu xa 'the rabbit and the bear were friends to one another'

Additives may be expressed by juxtaposition followed by the np yą, but this is not used often due to ambiguity (it might be interpreted as a possessive phrase):
 tohoxk wak yą ndǫhǫ 'I saw a horse and a cow'
 ąyato ąxti yą hamaki 'a man and a woman were coming'

Alternatives are expressed with juxtaposition followed by the particle ha (not otherwise an np):
 sįto sąki ha hanǫ 'is that a boy or a girl?'
 tohoxk waka ha hanǫ 'is that a horse or a cow?'

 Nominal particles (np) 

Biloxi has many nominal particles, and for the most part their function is unclear.

A non-exhaustive list:
 yą di yandi ką -k yąką ko ØFor the most part it's unclear what conditions the use of a particular np (or ∅), but the following can be said:

 ką, -k, yąk, yąką are only used with objects
 yandi almost always is used with human nouns (with exception)
 ko is used when the noun is a pronoun, when the main verb is stative, or when there is an interrogative present

 Verbs 

Simple verbs (not causatives or expanded verbs, see below) must contain a person marker, root, and number marker, and optionally the following:

Prefixes:
 thematic prefixes
 reciprocals, dative markers, reflexives
 instrumental markers

Suffixes:
 mode markers
 object markers

 Auxiliary constructions 

Biloxi contains a defective auxiliary verb (h)andE/yukE (ande is used in singular, yuke for plural). By itself it may mean 'to be' or 'to stay', but with another verb it lends durativity. The plural marker -tu is not used with yuke since the defective form itself already serves to mark number.

When the auxiliary construction is used, both the main verb and the auxiliary are inflected.

Examples:
 de ande 'he was departing'
 iduti yayuke 'you (pl.) are eating'

Generally to express the negative the stem is negated, rather than the auxiliary:
 kox ni yuke di 'they were unwilling'
 kukuhi ni yuke 'they could not raise (it)'

 Classificatory verbs 

Biloxi contains five classificatory verbs, which indicate duration and position of the subject: (See above for morphophonemic explanation of ||mąki|| > /max/.)
 nąki 'sitting'
 kak ayǫk yąhi inąki wo 'what have you suffered that causes you to sit and cry?'
 pa kidǫhi nąki 'she sat looking at her head'
 mąki 'reclining', 'in a horizontal position'
 įdahi ye daha max 'he continually sent for them'
 naxe ąki 'he listened (reclining)'
 plural form: mąxtu~amąki
 dǫhi amąx ką 'while they were looking at him'
 akikahį mąktu 'they were telling news to one another'
 ne 'upright'
 ta duxke ne ką 'he stood slaying the deer'
 kawak iye inedi wo 'what were you saying as you stood?'
 plural form: ne
 ade ne di 'they were moving'
 hine 'walking'
 ąya ni hine ayehǫ ni 'do you know the walking man?'
 tohoxkk ni hine ko toxka xe 'the walking horse is gray' (fem.)
 ande 'running'
 mani ande yą 'the (running) wild turkey'
 ąya tąhį yande ayehǫ ni 'do you know the running man?'

They may be used alone as verbs (kuhik mąx ką 'when it was lying high') but often reinforce synonymous roots:
 xe nąki 'she is sitting (sitting)'
 tox mąki 'he was lying (lying)'
 sįhįx ne 'it was standing (standing)'
 ąya ni hine ayehǫ ni 'do you know the walking (walking) man?'
 ąya tąhį yande ayehǫ ni 'do you know the running (running) man?'

They are used mostly with animates.

Classificatory verbs are only inflected for 2nd person (not 1st) when used as auxiliaries.

hamaki~amaki is used as the plural form for all five classificatory verbs (even optionally for mąki and ne, which have their own plural forms mąxtu~amąki and ne):
 ąksiyǫ yamaki wo 'are you all making arrows?'
 ca hanke te nkamaki na 'we wish to kill them' (masc.)
 ąya nǫpa ci hamaki nkehǫ ni 'I know the two reclining men'
 ąya nǫpa ni hamaki nkehǫ ni 'I know the two walking men'
 ąya xaxaxa hamaki ayehǫ ni 'do you know all the standing men?'

 Causatives 

The causative verb ||YE|| comes after (uninflected) stems to form a causative construction. In first and second person ha (sometimes h if followed by a vowel, see 3.1 above) is inserted between the stem and ||YE||.

Examples:
 axehe hanke nąki na 'I have stuck it in (as I sit)' (masc.)
 ca hiyetu 'you kill them all'
 te ye 'he killed her'

 Expanded verbs 

Serial verb constructions occur with two or three verbs in sequence. All are of the same person and number, but only the final stem has suffixes:
 nkǫ įkte xo 'I do it, I  will hit you if...'
 hane dusi duxke 'he found her, took her, and skinned her'

 Connectives 
Connectives may be co-ordinating or subordinating:

 Co-ordinating 

 Subordinating 
All subordinating connectives end the clause. ką is the most common by far and may be related to the np ką.

 Clauses 

Clauses may end no more than one clause final connective. Subordinating connectives are used to create dependent clauses.

In clauses, the following order generally holds:

(Connective) (Subject) (Object) (Adverb) Verb (Connective)

There are occasional examples of S and/or O occurring after the verb, always with animates. O rarely precedes S, possibly for emphasis.

Direct objects always precede indirect objects: ąya xi yandi ąxti yą int ką ku 'the chief gave him the woman''''.

Full sentences always end in independent clauses. Embedded sentences are not usually marked, but the horatory marker hi can be used if the embedded action has not yet occurred, and ni can be used if the action was not performed. wo (or wi'') is used for mistaken ideas.

See also 
 Biloxi tribe
 Tunica-Biloxi

References

Inline citations and notes

Sources referenced

External links 
Native Languages: Biloxi

Languages of the United States
Extinct languages of North America
Western Siouan languages
Languages extinct in the 1930s
1930s disestablishments in the United States